Parusnoye is a rural locality (a selo) in Usmanskoye 2-ye Rural Settlement, Novousmansky District, Voronezh Oblast, Russia. The population was 920 as of 2010. There are 11 streets.

Geography 
Parusnoye is located on the Tamlyk River, 15 km southeast of Novaya Usman (the district's administrative centre) by road. Podkletnoye is the nearest rural locality.

References 

Rural localities in Novousmansky District